Counties 1 Cumbria (formerly Cumbria League and Cumbria 1) is a competitive rugby union league at level 7 of the English rugby union system run by the English Rugby Football Union (RFU) for club sides based in Cumbria. It was previously a tier 7 league but the creation of North 2 West demoted it to level 8.  Promoted teams typically go up to North 2 West and since Cumbria 2 was cancelled at the end of the 2018–19 season there is no relegation.  Each season a team from Cumbria 1 is picked to take part in the RFU Senior Vase - a national competition for clubs at level 8.  The original Cumbria league was formed at the start of the 1992–93 season when the North-West North 1 division was cancelled.

Until the end of the 2017–18 season the Cumbria League was a single division involving 10 clubs and ranked at tier 8 of the English rugby union system.  The champions were automatically promoted to the now discontinued North Lancashire/Cumbria league and until the 2016–17 season the second placed team faced the runner-up from Lancashire (North) for the final promotion place until Lancashire (North) was cancelled.  There was no relegation due to it having been the lowest competitive league for Rugby Union in Cumbria.  It ran alongside the Cumbria 2 North & West and Cumbria 2 South & East Merit Leagues.

This changed for the 2018–19 season due to RFU having to restructure the northern leagues after 19 Lancashire based clubs withdrew from the league system to form their own competition.  The result was that the Cumbrian clubs based in North Lancashire/Cumbria joined the top 3 Cumbria League sides in Cumbria 1, while the rest of the Cumbrian League sides along with a handful of 2nd XV teams formed Cumbria 2.

Another change to the structure from the 2018–19 season was that the division would play two stages - the first involving all eight teams to decide who would be contesting promotion and relegation during the second stage when the division was divided into two mini leagues (one promotion/one relegation). In 2022 the RFU further restructured the adult community leagues and the Cumbria League was renamed Counties 1 Cumbria from the 2022–23 season.

Teams 2022–23
The 2022–23 Counties 1 Cumbria league consists of 12 teams. Eight of these competed in the 2021–22 Cumbria 1 competition; Creighton, Egremont, Hawcoat Park, Millon, Upper Eden, Whitehaven, Wigton and Workington. Cockermouth and St. Benedict's dropped down from North 2 West having finished 7th and 12th respectively. Penrith II joined the league as a new team and Silloth returned to league rugby after not taking part in any competition since the 2019–20 season. A ninth member of the 2021–22 Cumbria 1 league, Furness, had also been assigned to Counties 1 Cumbria but withdrew before the start of the season.

Teams 2021–22

The teams competing in 2021-22 achieved their places in the league based on performances in 2019-20, the 'previous season' column in the table below refers to that season not 2020-21. 

Outgoing teams St Benedicts and Cockermouth were promoted to North 2 West, and Windermere, who finished 12th but did not return, competed in the Cumbria 2 Shield (Group 1) instead.  Silloth, who finished 11th, were initially due to compete but withdrew before the season began.  Consequently the league was reduced from 13 sides to 9.

Season 2020–21

On 30 October 2020 the RFU announced  that due to the coronavirus pandemic a decision had been taken to cancel Adult Competitive Leagues (National League 1 and below) for the 2020/21 season meaning Cumbria 1 was not contested.

Teams 2019–20

Original teams

When this division was introduced in 1992 it contained the following teams:

Ambleside - transferred from North-West North 1 (8th)
British Steel - transferred from North-West North 1 (5th)
Carnforth - transferred from North-West North 1 (4th)
Creighton - transferred from North-West North 1 (7th)
Greengarth - joined league system
Millom - transferred from North-West North 1 (6th)
Silloth - transferred from North-West North 1 (8th)
Smith Brothers - transferred from North-West North 1 (3rd)
Whitehaven - transferred from North-West North 1 (9th)

Cumbria honours

Cumbria (1993–1996)

The Cumbria league was formed from teams from the old North-West North 1 division when it was disbanded at the end of the 1991–92 season.  Promotion was to Cumbria/Lancs North and as the basement division for clubs in the region there was no relegation.  Initially a tier 10 league, the creation of National 5 North for the 1993–94 season meant that Cumbria/Lancs North dropped to become a tier 11 league.

Cumbria (1996–2000) 

The league system was restructured from top to bottom by the Rugby Football Union for the start of the 1996–97 season.  The cancellation of National 5 North and creation of North West 3 meant that Cumbria remained a tier 11 league, with promotion into North Lancs/Cumbria (formerly Cumbria/Lancs North).

Cumbria (2000–2018)

Northern league restructuring by the RFU at the end of the 1999–00 season saw the cancellation of North West 1, North West 2 and North West 3 (tiers 7-9).  This meant that Cumbria became a tier 8 league, with promotion continuing to North Lancs/Cumbria.  As the lowest ranked league for clubs in the region there was no relegation until the introduction of Cumbria 2 at the end of the 2017–18 season.

Cumbria 1 (2018–2019) 

Restructuring of the north-west leagues at the end of the 2017–18 season, including the cancellation of North Lancs/Cumbria and the introduction of Cumbria 2, meant that Cumbria was renamed to Cumbria and became a tier 7 league.  Promotion was now up to North West 1 while relegation was to the new Cumbria 2.

Cumbria (2019–present) 

After just one season Cumbria 2 was cancelled and Cumbria 1 reverted to being a single division named Cumbria, while the introduction of North 2 West for the 2019–20 season meant that Cumbria dropped back to being a tier 8 league with promotion into this new division and no relegation. Adult community leagues were cancelled for the 2020–21 season. In 2021–22 the league was contested by nine teams and the league restructure meant that no teams were promoted at the end of the season.

Promotion play-offs

From the 2018–19 season onwards there was a play-off between the runners-up of Cumbria 1 and North 2 West for the third and final promotion place to North 1 West.  Previously Cumbria League sides had a play-off against Lancashire (North) for a place in the discontinued North Lancashire/Cumbria division (see following sub section).  As of 2019–20 North 2 West sides have one win to Cumbria's zero; and the home side has one win to the away side's zero.

Discontinued promotion play-offs

Between the 2000–01 and 2016–17 seasons there was a play-off between the runners-up of the Cumbria League and Lancashire (North) for the third and final promotion place to North Lancashire/Cumbria. The team with the superior league record has home advantage in the tie.  At the end of the 2016–17 season the Lancashire (North) teams have been the most successful with eleven wins to the Cumbria League team's four; and the home team has won promotion on twelve occasions compared to the away team's three.  Since the cancellation of Lancashire (North) the play-off has been discontinued.

Number of league titles

Keswick (5)
Hawcoat Park (3)
Netherhall (3)
Ambleside (2)
Furness (2)
Millom (2)
Upper Eden (2)
Whitehaven (2)
Workington (2)
Carnforth (1)
Egremont (1)
Moresby (1)
Silloth (1)
Smith Brothers (1)
St. Benedict's (1)

See also
 Cumbria RU
 RFU Intermediate Cup
 English rugby union system
 Rugby union in England

Notes

References

7
Rugby union in Cumbria